The 353d Bombardment Squadron is an inactive United States Air Force unit. It last was assigned to the 301st Bombardment Wing, stationed at Lockbourne Air Force Base, Ohio. It was inactivated on 8 June 1964.

During World War II, the 353d Bombardment Squadron was a B-17 Flying Fortress squadron, assigned to the 301st Bombardment Group, Fifteenth Air Force. It earned two Distinguished Unit Citations.

History
It was established as a B-17 Flying Fortress heavy bombardment squadron in early 1942, and trained under Second Air Force. It flew antisubmarine patrols off the California coast from, late May to early June 1942, then over the Mid-Atlantic coast during June to July 1942.

The squadron was deployed to the European Theater of Operations (ETO) in August 1942, being assigned to VIII Bomber Command, one of the first B-17 heavy bomb squadrons assigned to England. It was engaged in strategic bombardment operations over occupied Europe, attacking enemy military and industrial targets. It was reassigned to the Mediterranean Theater of Operations (MTO) as part of the Operation Torch invasion of North Africa. It was assigned to Twelfth Air Force and operated from desert airfields in Algeria and Tunisia during the North African and Tunisian campaign. It was assigned to the Northwest African Strategic Air Force during the invasion of Sicily and later Italy in 1943. It was allocated to Fifteenth Air Force for strategic bombing of Nazi Germany and occupied Europe. It attacked enemy targets primarily in the Balkans, Southern France, Southern Germany, and Austria from southern Italy. It engaged in shuttle bombing missions to airfields in the Soviet Union during the summer of 1944.

Personnel were largely demobilized after German capitulation in May 1945. The squadron was reassigned to the United States and was programmed for conversion to B-29 Superfortress operations and deployment to Pacific Theater. These plans were canceled after Japanese capitulation in August 1945. The aircraft were sent to storage and the unit was inactivated largely as a paper unit in October 1945.

It was reactivated in 1946 as a Strategic Air Command B-29 strategic bombardment squadron. It was deployed to Fürstenfeldbruck AB, Germany, July–August 1948; to RAF Station Scrampton, England, October 1948 – January 1949; and to RAF Stations Lakenheath and Sculthorpe, May–November 1950 for "show of force" missions in Europe as a result of the Berlin Blockade by the Soviet Union and rising Cold War tensions in Europe. The squadron was deployed to Far East Air Forces in February 1951, flying combat missions over North Korea, and attacking strategic industrial and military targets during the Korean War.

The squadron returned to the United States in June 1952, equipped with YRB-47B Stratojet long-range reconnaissance aircraft. It was used for strategic reconnaissance missions until 1953, when production RB-47E aircraft were received. It flew reconnaissance missions on a worldwide basis. Operations of the unit were still classified. It was suspected that the squadron was deployed frequently to Thule AB, Greenland and flew missions deep into the heart of the Soviet Union, taking a photographic and radar recording of the routes attacking SAC B-52 bombers would follow to reach their targets.

The squadron was inactivated in 1964 with phaseout of the B-47 from the inventory.

Lineage
 Constituted 353d Bombardment Squadron (Heavy) on 28 January 1942
 Activated on 3 February 1942.
 Re-designated 353d Bombardment Squadron (Very Heavy) on 5 August 1945
 Inactivated on 15 October 1945
 Activated on 4 August 1946
 Re-designated 353d Bombardment Squadron (Medium) on 28 May 1948
 Inactivated on 16 June 1964

Assignments
 301st Bombardment Group, 3 February 1942 – 15 October 1945; 4 August 1946 (detached 10 February 1951 – 16 June 1952)
 301st Bombardment Wing, 16 June 1952 – 8 June 1964

Stations

 Geiger Field, Washington, 3 February 1942
 Alamogordo Army Air Field, New Mexico, 28 May 1942
 Operated From: Muroc Army Air Base, California, c. 28 May-14 June 1942
 Richard E. Byrd Field, Virginia, 21 June-19 July 1942
 RAF Chelveston (AAF-105), England, 19 August 1942
 Tafaraoui Airfield, Algeria, 24 November 1942
 Biskra Airfield, Algeria, 21 December 1942
 Ain M'lila Airfield, Algeria, 16 January 1943
 Saint-Donat Airfield, Algeria, 8 March 1943
 Oudna Airfield, Tunisia, 6 August 1943

 Cerignola Airfield, Italy, 10 December 1943
 Lucera Airfield, Italy, 2 February 1944 – July 1945
 Sioux Falls Army Air Field, South Dakota, 28 July 1945
 Mountain Home Army Air Field, Idaho, 17 August 1945
 Pyote Army Air Base, Texas, 23 August-15 October 1945.
 Clovis Army Air Field, New Mexico, 4 August 1946
 Smoky Hill Army Airfield, Kansas, 16 July 1947
 Barksdale AFB, Louisiana, 7 November 1949
 Deployed to Kadena AB, Okinawa, 10 February 1951 – 16 June 1952
 Lockbourne AFB, Ohio, 15 April 1958 – 8 June 1964

Aircraft
 B-17 Flying Fortress, 1942–1945
 B-29 Superfortress 1946–1952
 YRB-47B Stratojet, 1952–1953
 RB-47E Stratojet, 1953–1964

See also

 Boeing B-17 Flying Fortress Units of the Mediterranean Theater of Operations

References

 

Military units and formations established in 1942
Bombardment squadrons of the United States Air Force
Bombardment squadrons of the United States Army Air Forces